How it Happens is a Canadian science television series which aired on CBC Television in 1973.

Premise
This series on science was geared towards youth, exploring questions such as how jet plane avoid colliding or how spaghetti is made.

Scheduling
This half-hour series was broadcast on Tuesdays at 5:00 p.m. (Eastern) from 23 October to 25 December 1973. It was rebroadcast in the same time slot from July to September 1974 and from July to September 1975.

References

External links
 

CBC Television original programming
1973 Canadian television series debuts
1973 Canadian television series endings